William Osmund Cregar (May 2, 1925 – December 28, 2019) was an American football guard who played for the Pittsburgh Steelers. He played college football at the College of the Holy Cross, having previously attended Frank H. Morrell High School. He is a member of the College of the Holy Cross Athletic Hall of Fame.

Cregar later joined the FBI in the early 1950s and worked as a CIA–FBI liaison agent and then chief of the FBI counter‐intelligence agency. A colleague, Jay Aldhizer described Cregar as having a "high profile in the intelligence community...a flamboyant personality, with a desk-pounding, get what I want type of relationship with CIA". He retired from the FBI as the Assistant Director of Foreign Intelligence and Counter Espionage in 1980.

References

2019 deaths
1925 births
American football linebackers
Holy Cross Crusaders football players
Pittsburgh Steelers players
Players of American football from Newark, New Jersey